The discography of Clutch, an American rock band, consists of thirteen studio albums, five live albums, three compilation albums, five extended plays, ten singles, and two video albums.

Clutch was formed in 1991 by vocalist Neil Fallon, guitarist Tim Sult, bassist Dan Maines and drummer Jean-Paul Gaster. The group debuted with Pitchfork, an EP released in October that same year. The band built a local following through constant gigging and released their second EP Passive Restraints through Earache). Clutch was signed by the East West Records label and released their full-length debut Transnational Speedway League. A self-titled album appeared two years later, which afforded the band some mainstream exposure.

Clutch then signed with major label Columbia for 1998's The Elephant Riders, but released 1999's Jam Room on their own River Road Records label.

In 2001 the band signed with Atlantic for the release of Pure Rock Fury, which included guest appearances from members of Spirit Caravan and Sixty Watt Shaman.

Their sixth album, Blast Tyrant, appeared three years later and was the first through DRT Entertainment,  followed by Robot Hive/Exodus in 2005, which featured the first lineup change since the early 1990s; the addition of organist Mick Schauer. 2007 saw the release of From Beale Street to Oblivion, and in the next year their first video, entitled Full Fathom Five: Video Field Recordings, which was accompanied by a CD version Full Fathom Five: Audio Field Recordings.

In 2009, Clutch released Strange Cousins from the West on their own label, Weathermaker Music. The band was once again a four-piece, without Schauer in the line-up.

In 2013, they released their tenth studio album Earth Rocker again through Weathermaker, their highest charting record in the US at the time. It peaked at number 15 on the Billboard 200 chart.

In 2015, they released Psychic Warfare on Weathermaker, peaking at number 11 on the Billboard 200. That same year, they also released a compilation album, La Curandera, exclusively on pink vinyl, as part of the Ten Bands, One Cause campaign for breast cancer awareness.

In 2018, the band released Book of Bad Decisions on Weathermaker, their twelfth studio album.

In 2022, Clutch released Sunrise on Slaughter Beach on Weathermaker, their thirteenth studio album.

Albums

Studio albums

Live albums

Compilation albums

Video albums

Extended plays

Singles

Music videos

Other appearances

Unreleased material and B-sides
In addition to Slow Hole to China (remastered and re-released in 2009), Pitchfork & Lost Needles and Basket of Eggs, Clutch frequently hides B-sides or "Easter Eggs" on their albums. Some of these may be found in import version of classic albums, in deluxe packages (such as Earth Rocker: Deluxe Edition), in remasters and re-releases (such as those re-released on Weathermaker Music with bonus and live tracks), or as singles and EPs. Clutch has also released such songs for Record Store Day and even movie soundtracks. Some of these standalone songs, not generally attached to albums such as Slow Hole to China, Pitchfork and Lost Needles or Basket of Eggs, include:

For Record Store Day 2014, Clutch released "Run, John Barleycorn, Run" as a split single with Lionize, featuring their song "Ether Madness". For 2015, Clutch released their 2009 album From Beale Street to Oblivion as a 2-LP set on purple vinyl, limited to 1,300 copies.  For 2016, Clutch released an exclusive 12-inch vinyl EP with the two bonus tracks from their 2015 album "Psychic Warfare", containing "Mad Sidewinder" and "Outland Special Clearance", limited to 3,000 copies.

References

External links 
Clutch

Heavy metal group discographies

Discographies of American artists